is a feminine Japanese given name.

Possible writings
Marie can be written using different kanji characters and can mean:
真理恵, "truth, blessing"
万里江, "long distance, big river"
真理絵, "truth, picture"
万里絵, "long distance, picture"
麻理恵 , "hemp, reason, blessing"
The name can also be written in hiragana or katakana.

People 
, Japanese figure skater
Marié Digby (born 1983), American singer-songwriter, guitarist, and pianist
Marie Helvin (born 1952), Japanese-American supermodel
, Japanese model and actress
, Japanese actress
, Japanese home organizer
, Japanese voice actress
, Japanese voice actress
, Japanese rugby sevens player

Fictional characters
Marie Gold (レスリー星人マリー・ゴールド), is a character from Tokusou Sentai Dekaranger

Japanese feminine given names